Hystrix may refer to:
 Ichthyosis hystrix, a class of rare skin disorder characterized by massive hyperkeratosis with an appearance like spiny scales

Biology 
 Hystrix (diatom) , a diatom genus
 Hystrix (plant) , a plant genus in the family Poaceae
 Hystrix (mammal), a rodent genus

Computing 
 a library to implement the bulkhead pattern from Netflix, see Hystrix